In a Tidal Wave of Mystery is the debut studio album of American indie pop duo Capital Cities, released on June 4, 2013, under Capitol Records.

Background and production
Ryan Merchant and Sebu Simonian worked as jingle writers for various companies before meeting on Craigslist and deciding to form Capital Cities. The pair then wrote "Safe and Sound" and began working on their debut album; the title In a Tidal Wave of Mystery originates from a lyric in the third verse of "Safe and Sound". Merchant and Simonian wrote, composed, produced and mixed the entirety of the album, with the exception of "Lazy Lies", produced by Simon Mills. Outkast member André 3000, vocalist Shemika Secrest and NPR's Frank Tavares are featured on the song "Farrah Fawcett Hair", while vocalist Soseh is featured on "Chasing You".

The Deluxe Edition Bonus Track of this album features a cover of Prince's "Nothing Compares 2 U".

Release
The album's cover artwork was designed by Brazilian artist João Lauro Fonte. 

In a Tidal Wave of Mystery was released on June 4, 2013, by Capitol Records and was the first Capitol Records album to be distributed by Universal Music Group, following the break-up of Capitol's previous distributor EMI. It was released on compact disc and 180 gram heavyweight black vinyl, limited to 5,000 copies. It debuted at number 66 on the United States Billboard 200 albums chart. A deluxe vinyl version of the album, including the digital album's four bonus track, was reissued in 2014 on 2xLP.

Singles
The album's lead single "Safe and Sound" was released digitally on January 6, 2011. Capitol Records serviced the single to United States modern rock radio over a year later on November 27, 2012, and it topped the Billboard Alternative Songs chart. It subsequently became the duo's breakout hit, peaking at number eight on the Billboard Hot 100 and reaching the top ten of numerous mainstream charts internationally.

"Kangaroo Court" was issued as the second single on June 7, 2013 and impacted US modern rock radio on August 6, 2013. "I Sold My Bed, But Not My Stereo" was released digitally in select territories on November 11, 2013, as the third overall single from the album. "One Minute More", originally released as a stand-alone single on April 14, 2011, was later included on the deluxe edition of In a Tidal Wave of Mystery and re-released as the album's fourth single on March 25, 2014.

Though not a single, the album's twelfth track, "Love Away", was originally released as the final track of their 2011 self-titled extended-play.

Critical reception

Matt Collar of AllMusic wrote a positive review of In a Tidal Wave of Mystery, describing it as an "infectious mix of synth-heavy dance pop" and drawing comparisons to American rock group MGMT and Italian musician Giorgio Moroder. Chloe Ravat of Gigwise wrote that Merchant and Simonian's "[jingle-writing] skills have been successfully transferred to their debut LP", opining that "[they] are damn sure on how to write a good electro pop song." Ravat, however, felt that its tracks, while good, did not contain "enough individuality in them to distinguish one from the others or stop each blurring into the next", ultimately describing the album as a whole as "good background listening for a lazy summer's day spent on a picnic blanket, [but] a little too late in the year." Chuck Arnold of People wrote: "With its buoyant synth-pop sheen, 'Safe and Sound,' the hit single that opens this disc, is bound to be one of the songs of summer. And this new duo keep the hooks coming on tracks like 'I Sold My Bed but Not My Stereo.'"

Track listing
All songs written and produced by Ryan Merchant and Sebu Simonian, except where noted.

The iTunes version of the deluxe edition of the album omits "Nothing Compares 2 U."

Personnel
Credits for In a Tidal Wave of Mystery adapted from album liner notes.
Capital Cities
 Ryan Merchant – mixing, production, songwriting, vocals
 Sebu Simonian – mixing, production, songwriting, vocals

Additional personnel

 André Benjamin – rapping, songwriting
 Channing Holmes – drums
 Andrew Kzirian – oud
 Spencer Ludwig – trumpet
 Mike Marsh – mastering
 Nick Merwin – guitar
 Simon Mills – production

 Manny Quintero – bass
 Shemika Secrest – vocals
 Soseh – vocals
 Frank Tavares – narration
 Karen Thompson – mastering
 Brian Warfield – trumpet

Charts

Certifications

References

2013 debut albums
Capital Cities (band) albums
Capitol Records albums